The Chief of the Defence ( / ), until 2009 the Chief of the General Staff ( / ), is the principal head of the Bulgarian Armed Forces. The chief is appointed by the President of Bulgaria, who is the commander-in-chief. The position dates back to the Principality of Bulgaria. The current Chief of the Defence is Admiral Emil Eftimov.

List of the Chiefs

Ward of Stroevo (1879−1890)

General Staff of the Bulgarian Land Army (1890−1895)

Headquarters of the Bulgarian Army (1896−1899)

General Staff (1900−1903)

Army Staff (1903−1947)

General Staff (1947−2009)

Chief of the Defence (2009−present)

See also
Bulgarian Land Forces
Bulgarian Air Force
Bulgarian Navy

References

External links

Military of Bulgaria
Chiefs of the Defence of Bulgaria
Bulgaria